Roderick 'Roddy' I Frame (born 1941), is a male former swimmer who competed for England.

Swimming career
He represented England in the 440 yards individual medley, at the 1962 British Empire and Commonwealth Games in Perth, Western Australia.

He was a member of the York City Swimming Club.

References

English male swimmers
1941 births
Swimmers at the 1962 British Empire and Commonwealth Games
Living people
Commonwealth Games competitors for England